Khaldoun Al Tabari (born January 1, 1950) is a Jordanian businessman. He served as Vice-Chairman and Chief Executive Officer of Drake & Scull International PJSC (now Emcor) from 1998 until 2016.

Early life and education
Khaldoun Al Tabari was born on 1 January 1950, in Jerusalem. He was educated at the Ramallah Friends High School, founded by Quakers in 1901. He then went to the United States to attend the University of Colorado. He graduated with a bachelor’s degree in Engineering and Business Management in 1972.

Business career
When Al Tarabi finished his studies, he went to the United Arab Emirates to join his family business. In the UAE, he managed and ran part of Ranya Trading & Contracting, an organisation that worked in various industries including electro-mechanical engineering, trading and contracting activities, construction materials, wholesale, and retail of pharmaceutical products. 

In 1982, Al Tabari moved to Saudi Arabia and founded a mechanical service company. He then bought a major stake in Drake & Scull International (DSI), the UAE-based international arm of the UK mechanical, electrical and plumbing (MEP) specialist. In 1998, he was appointed Vice Chairman and CEO of DSI PJSC when he bought the company. He later acquired all the outstanding shares from Drake and Scull UK and changed its name to Emcor Engineering.

Under his leadership, Drake & Scull international PJSC developed from a local MEP contractor to a regional leader, offering integrated engineering disciplines across the MENA region, Europe, and South Asia. Tabari launched an Initial Public Offering (IPO) in 2008 on the Dubai Financial Market Exchange globally ranked among the top 20 IPOs. During that time, DSI operated multiple projects including Emirates Golf Club, the first PGA-approved Golf course in the Middle East; The Jumeirah Beach Hotel; The Four Seasons Hotel in Doha; and The State Audit Bureau in Kuwait.

In 2016, Al Tabari stepped down from his role at DSI PJSC and later sold his stake in the publicly listed company and in 2017, he resigned from his seat as vice chairman of the board.  As of 2022, he runs his own family office and is a director of the Ramallah Friends School in Palestine.

Board memberships
Al Tabari also served as Chairman of EMCOR Facilities Services Group, Executive Chairman of Vision Investments, Board Member of DEPA public share holding company, Board Member of Walltech, Director of EHC Cooperation, Board Member of Energy Central in Bahrain, Board member of Zimmam (Thrifty Rent A car), Board Member of Carbon Holdings Limited, Board member of Arab chemicals and manufacturing company in Jordan, and Chairman of Beverly Hills Polo Club Licensing agreement for BHPC clothing in the UAE.

References

1950 births
Living people
Businesspeople from Jerusalem
Jordanian chief executives
University of Colorado Boulder alumni